Hypolobus is a species of plants in the family Apocynaceae first described as a genus in 1885. It contains only one known species, Hypolobus infractus, endemic to the State of Bahia in Brazil.

References

Endemic flora of Brazil
Asclepiadoideae
Monotypic Apocynaceae genera